Crossover is an American comic book ongoing series created by Donny Cates, Geoff Shaw, Dee Cunniffe and John J. Hill, and is being published by Image Comics.

The series debuted on November 4, 2020 and is put on hold on August 18, 2022.

Premise 
In 2017, fictional characters from comic books, across various publishers and genres, come to life in the real world, causing mayhem, destruction and death around the city of Denver, Colorado.

Five years later, a ragtag team of humans and characters join forces and embark on a quest to return to Denver, now domed off and containing the displaced characters, to find out the cause behind "The Event".

Publication history 
In July 2020, during San Diego Comic-Con, Image Comics announced a comic book series titled Crossover, created by Donny Cates, Geoff Shaw, Dee Cunniffe and John J. Hill. Three years earlier, they created God Country and Redneck, two other Image series.

According to Cates and Shaw during an interview on IGN, the story is inspired by the concept of several crossover summer events that are presented by comic book publishers like DC Comics, Marvel Comics, among others, with the story being inspired on "Avengers: Endgame as Cloverfield", and they also revealed the possibility for other characters from Image and other owners to appear.

Following the release of issue #1 in 3D edition on August 18, 2022, Image put the series on hold to release another comic book titled Vanish, also co-created by Cates.

Characters

Main
 Ellipses "Ellie" Howell — A survivor of the Event in Denver, Colorado, who works as an employee for a direct market retailer in Otto's comic book store, but now wants to return to her home. She is in fact a character from the fictional world.
 Orion "Ryan" Lowe — The son of an extremist Protestant, who previously has an altercation with Ellie and the others, but according to a prisoner in the Powerhouse (whose identity is later revealed), he will play a role in ending the Event.
 Ava Quinn — A citizen from the other world, who has superpowers of her own and befriends Ellie.
 Otto — The owner of a comic book store in Provo, Utah, who is Ellie's boss.
 Father Lowe — Ryan's abusive father and an extremist Protestant, who strongly believes the Event in Denver is the Devil's work to the point of planning a war against the characters.
 Nathaniel Abrams Pendleton — The Special Director of the Powerhouse, an organization that hunts characters, to the point of even doing experiments on them. He secretly instructs Ryan to find the way to end the Event, while holds Donny Cates as a prisoner against his will.

Guest 
 Brian Michael Bendis
 Stefano Caselli
 Donny Cates
 Jonathan Hickman
 Megan Hutchison
 Robert Kirkman
 Michael Avon Oeming
 Geoff Shaw
 Brian K. Vaughan
 Chip Zdarsky

Returning

Issues

Reception 
Oscar Maltby wrote for Newsarama that the first issue was "bold as hell" and an intriguing start.

Collected editions

References

Comics about parallel universes
Image Comics titles
2020 comics debuts
Crossover comics
Metafictional works